Ellis is a surname of Welsh and English origin. An independent French origin of the surname is said to derive from the phrase fleur-de-lis.

Surname

A
Abe Ellis (Stargate), a fictional character in the TV series Stargate Atlantis
Adam Ellis (born 1996), British speedway rider
Adrienne Ellis (born 1944), American-Canadian actress
Albert Ellis (disambiguation), multiple people
Alexander Ellis (disambiguation), multiple people
Allan Ellis (disambiguation)
Alton Ellis (1938–2008), Jamaican musician
Andrew Ellis (disambiguation), multiple people
Anita Ellis (disambiguation), multiple people
Annette Ellis (born 1946), Australian politician
Arthur Ellis (disambiguation), multiple people
Atom Ellis (born 1966), American musician
Aunjanue Ellis (born 1969), American actress

B
Ben Ellis (disambiguation), multiple people
Bill Ellis (1919–2007), English cricketer
Boaz Ellis (born 1981), Israeli fencer
Bob Ellis (born 1942), Australian writer and journalist
Bobby Ellis (born 1932), Jamaican trumpeter
Boogie Ellis (born 2000), American basketball player
Brad Ellis, American composer and musical director
Bret Easton Ellis (born 1964), American novelist
Brian Ellis (disambiguation), multiple people
Bruce Ellis (born 1960), Australian computer scientist

C
C. P. Ellis (1927–2005), American Ku Klux Klan leader turned civil rights activist
Caroline Ellis (born 1950), American actress
Carson Ellis (born 1975), American artist
Charles Ellis (disambiguation), multiple people
Chris Ellis (disambiguation), multiple people
 Rev Clement Ellis (1633–1700), English clergyman
Clough Williams-Ellis (1883–1978), Welsh architect
Constance Ellis (1872–1942), first woman to graduate from the University of Melbourne as a Doctor of Medicine (1903)
Craig Ellis (born 1974), former Australian-rules footballer
Craig Ellis (gridiron football) (born 1961), former Canadian footballer

D
Dale Ellis (born 1960), retired American basketball player
Dana Ellis (born 1980), Canadian pole-vaulter
Daniel Ellis (disambiguation) or Dan Ellis, multiple people
David Ellis (disambiguation) or Dave Ellis, multiple people
DeGoy B. Ellis (1876–1949), American politician and lawyer
Diane Ellis (1909–1930), American actress
Dick Ellis (1895–1975), treacherous intelligence officer
Dock Ellis (1945–2008), American baseball player
Dock Ellis (born 1955) American radio DJ
Don Ellis (1934–1978), American jazz trumpeter
Dorothy Ellis (1935–2018), American blues singer
Doug Ellis (1924–2018), English entrepreneur and chairman of Aston Villa Football Club
Drew Ellis (disambiguation), multiple people

E
Earl Hancock Ellis (1880–1923), US Marine Corps intelligence officer
Edgar C. Ellis (1854–1947), American politician and lawyer
Edith Ellis (1861–1916), English author and women's rights activist
Edmund Ellis (disambiguation), multiple people
Edward Ellis (disambiguation), multiple people
Edwin Ellis (disambiguation), multiple people
Eleanor Joan Ellis (1904–1989), English artist
Ellen Deborah Ellis (1878–1974), American Professor of history and political science
Ellis Bell (1818–1848), pseudonym of Emily Jane Bronte
Emory Ellis (1906–2003), American biochemist
Ephraim Ellis (born 1985), Canadian actor
Eric Ellis (disambiguation), multiple people
Ernest Ellis (1885–1916), English footballer
Evelyn Ellis (1894–1958), African-American actress

F
Felix Ellis, Australian politician
Francis Ellis (disambiguation), multiple people
Frank Ellis (disambiguation), multiple people
Fred Ellis (disambiguation), multiple people
Francis Whyte Ellis

G
Gary Ellis (born 1968), American BMX racer
Geoff Ellis (born 1950), Welsh cricketer
Georgia Ellis (1917–1988), American actress
George Ellis (disambiguation), multiple people
George Agar-Ellis, 1st Baron Dover (1797–1833), British politician
Gerry Ellis (born 1957), former American football player
Greg Ellis (disambiguation), multiple people

H
Harold Ellis (disambiguation), multiple people
Harry Ellis (born 1982), English rugby union player
Harvey Ellis (1852–1904), American architect, perspective renderer and painter
Havelock Ellis (1859–1939), English sexual psychologist
Henry Ellis (disambiguation), multiple people
Herb Ellis (1921–2010), American jazz guitarist
Herbert Ellis (disambiguation), multiple people
Hortense Ellis (1941–2000), Jamaican reggae artist
Hunter Ellis (born 1968), American television personality

I
Izzy Ellis, animator for Looney Tunes cartoons.

J
C. Jack Ellis, former mayor of Macon, Georgia
J. Delano Ellis (1944–2020), American Pentecostal bishop and writer
Jack Ellis (disambiguation), multiple people
James Ellis (disambiguation), multiple people
James Ellis Humphrey (1861–1897), American botanist and mycologist
Jan Ellis (1942–2013), South African rugby union player
Janet Ellis (born 1955), English television presenter
Jason Ellis (born 1971), Australian skateboarder, mixed martial artist, radio host and actor
 Jay Ellis (born 1981), American actor
Jeff Ellis (disambiguation), multiple people
Jerry Ellis (disambiguation), multiple people
Jill Ellis (born 1966), English-born American soccer player and coach
Jim Ellis (disambiguation), multiple people
Jimmy Ellis (disambiguation), multiple people
Jo Ellis (born 1983) English field hockey forward
Joanne Ellis (born 1981), English field hockey midfielder
Job Bicknell Ellis (1829–1905), American mycologist
John Ellis (disambiguation), multiple people
Joseph Ellis (born 1943), American professor of history

K
Kaden Elliss (born 1995), American football player
Kai Ellis (born 1980), former CFL defensive end
Kate Ellis (politician) (born 1977), Australian politician
Katharine Ellis, British musicologist and academic
Katherine Ellis, English singer-songwriter
Kathleen Ellis (born 1946), former American swimmer
Keith Ellis (disambiguation), multiple people
Keon Ellis (born 2000), American basketball player
Kerry Ellis (born 1979), English singer and stage actress
Kevin Ellis (disambiguation), multiple people

L
LaPhonso Ellis (born 1970), former American Basketball Player, National Basketball Association
Larry R. Ellis (born 1946), commander in the U.S. Army (2001–04)
Lauren Ellis (born 1989), New Zealand cyclist
Lee Ellis (born 1942), American sociologist
Leonora Beck Ellis (1862–1951), American educator, author, poet, social reformer
LeRon Ellis (born 1969), former American professional basketball player
Leroy Ellis (born 1940), retired American basketball player
Lester Ellis (born 1965), English/Australian boxer
Lindsay Ellis (footballer) (born 1935), retired Australian rules football player
Lindsay Ellis (media critic) (born 1985), web video creator
Lionel Ellis (1885–1970), British military historian
Liz Ellis (born 1973), retired Australian netball player
Luther Ellis (born 1973), former American football player

M
Magen Ellis (born 1986), American beauty queen
Marc Ellis (rugby) (born 1971), New Zealand businessman and television presenter and former rugby player
Marc H. Ellis (born 1952), American author
Margaret Dye Ellis (1845-1925), American social reformer
Mari Ellis (1913–2015), Welsh writer and women's rights activist
Mark Ellis (disambiguation), multiple people
Martin Beazor Ellis (1911–1996), British mycologist
Mary Ellis (disambiguation), multiple people
Mary Beth Ellis (born 1977), American triathlete
Matt Ellis (disambiguation) or Matthew Ellis, multiple people
Max Mapes Ellis (1887–1953), American ichthyologist
 Max Ellis, Wrestling national champion (2006–present) (?) 
Merrill Ellis (1916–1981), American electroacoustic composer
Michael Ellis (disambiguation) or Mike Ellis, multiple people
Monta Ellis (born 1985), American professional basketball player

N
Nancy Walker Bush Ellis (1926–2021), American political activist
Nick Ellis, American professor of psychology
Novalyne Price Ellis (1908–1999), American schoolteacher

O
Osian Ellis (1928–2021), Welsh harpist

P
Patricia Ellis (1916–1970), American film actress
Patrick Ellis (educator) (1928–2013), brother of the Institute of Brothers of Christian Schools and president of CUA (1992–98)
Patrick Ellis (radio host) (1943–2020), American radio show host
Paul Ellis, New Zealand record producer
Pee Wee Ellis (1941–2021), American saxophonist
Perry Ellis (1940–1986), American fashion designer
Peter Ellis (disambiguation), multiple people
Philip Ellis (disambiguation), multiple people
Pitts Ellis, American politician
Powhatan Ellis (1790–1863), US senator from Mississippi

R
Ralph Ellis (disambiguation), multiple people
Ray Ellis (1923–2008), American record producer and composer
Ray Ellis (American football) (born 1959), former American football player
Raymond Ellis (1923–1994), British Labour Party politician
Reg Ellis (disambiguation), multiple people
Richard Ellis (disambiguation), multiple people
Rick Ellis (disambiguation), multiple people
Rita Ellis (born  1951), first woman mayor of Delray Beach, Florida
Robert Ellis (disambiguation), multiple people
Robin Ellis (born 1942), English actor
Robinson Ellis (1834–1913), English classical scholar
Rod Ellis, linguist
Rodney Ellis (born 1954), African-American politician from Texas
Romallis Ellis (born 1965), former American boxer
Ron Ellis (born 1945), retired Canadian ice hockey player
Ronald Ellis (disambiguation), multiple people
Rosemary Ellis (1910–1998), English artist
Ross Ellis (1915–1983), Canadian politician
Rowland Ellis (1650–1731), Welsh Quaker
Rowland Ellis (bishop) (1841–1911), Welsh clergyman
Royston Ellis (born 1941), English writer
Ruth Ellis (1926–1955), last woman to be executed in the UK
Ruth Ellis (activist) (1899–2000), American gay rights activist
Ryan Ellis (disambiguation), multiple people

S
Samuel Ellis (disambiguation) or Sam/Sammy/Samuel, multiple people
Sara L. Ellis (born 1969), American judge
Sarah Stickney Ellis (1799–1872), English writer
Scott Ellis (disambiguation), multiple people
Sedrick Ellis (born 1985), American football player
Seger Ellis (1904–1995), American jazz pianist
Shaun Ellis (born 1977), American footballer
Shaun Ellis English animal researcher
Shirley Ellis (born 1941), American soul singer
Simon Ellis (disambiguation), multiple people
Sophia Ellis (born 1996), record-setting British female powerlifter
Sophie Ellis-Bextor (born 1979), English pop singer
Stanley Ellis (disambiguation), multiple people
Steven Ellis (disambiguation), multiple people
Susan Williams-Ellis (1918–2007), English potter designer

T
T. E. Ellis (1859–1899), Welsh politician
T. S. Ellis, III (born 1940), U.S. federal judge in the trial of William J. Jefferson 
Ted Ellis (disambiguation), multiple people
Terry Ellis (born 1963), African-American R&B singer
Terry Ellis (manager) (born 1944), English record producer
Theodore T. Ellis (1867–1934), American inventor and publisher
Thomas Ellis (disambiguation), multiple people
Timo Ellis (born 1970), American musician and record producer
Tino Ellis (born 1997), American football player
Tinsley Ellis (born 1957), American blues/rock musician
Tom Ellis (actor) (born 1979), Welsh actor
Tom Ellis (UK politician) (born 1924), former British politician
Tommy Ellis (born 1947), former American NASCAR racing driver
Tony Ellis (born 1964), former English professional footballer

V
Vivian Ellis (1903–1996), English musical comedy composer

W
W. Ellis (MCC cricketer), English cricketer 
Walter Ellis (born 1946), Northern Irish writer
Walter E. Ellis (1960–2013), American serial killer
Warren Ellis (born 1968), English comic book author
Warren Ellis (musician) (born 1965), Australian musician and composer
Welbore Ellis (disambiguation), multiple people
Wes Ellis (1932–1984), American professional golfer
William Ellis (disambiguation), multiple people

See also
Elles
Ellice (disambiguation)
Elis (given name)
Elis (surname)
Elys (disambiguation), which includes people with the given name or surname

References

English-language surnames
Surnames of English origin
Welsh-language surnames